HAT-P-20 is a K-type main-sequence star about 232 light-years away. The star has a strong starspot activity, and its equatorial plane is misaligned by 36° with the planetary orbit. Although star with a giant planet on close orbit is expected to be spun-up by tidal forces, only weak indications of tidal spin-up were detected.

Planetary system
In 2010 a transiting hot super-Jovian planet was detected. Its equilibrium temperature is 996 K.

References

Gemini (constellation)
K-type main-sequence stars
Planetary systems with one confirmed planet
Planetary transit variables
J07273995+2420118